Cultural property law is the body of law that protects and regulates the disposition of culturally significant material, including historic real property, ancient and historic artifacts, artwork, and intangible cultural property. Cultural property can be any property, tangible or intangible, having special significance to a defined group of people, whether or not the group is vested with a traditional property interest.  Cultural property laws may be international (such as international conventions or bilateral agreements) or domestic (such as federal laws or state laws).

Major issues

Cultural property during armed conflict
Two major treaties have dealt with the issue of cultural heritage protection during armed conflict:
 Roerich Pact of 1935, amongst the Pan American Union
 Hague Convention for the Protection of Cultural Property in the Event of Armed Conflict of 1954, superseding the Roerich Pact.

Repatriation and looting

Repatriation issues may also apply domestically, for instance, in the United States, the 1990 Native American Graves Protection and Repatriation Act (NAGPRA)

Real property and built environment

See also

 Art and culture law
 Cultural heritage
 Property law
 Treasure trove

References

External links
The Cultural Property and Archaeology Law Blog
Heritage Law Bibliography
[Saunders, Pammela Q., "A Sea Change Off the Coast of Maine: Common Pool Resources as Cultural Property, vol. 60, Emory L.J. (June 2011), https://ssrn.com/abstract=1701225]

Property law
Cultural heritage
Art and cultural repatriation
Art and culture law